2XL is a Polish drama television series, broadcast on Polsat from September 5, 2013 on Thursdays at 10:00 pm.

Plot 
Agata Dec is a professional biologist, she is successful at her job, but she has a lot of self-esteem problems associated with obesity. She eats only  salads and drinks a lot of coffee, which leads to frequent fainting. Finally, she goes to the hospital, where a doctor advises her to contact a dietitian. That leads her to meeting Laura Zabawska who is also struggling with being overweight. As a result of problems in her marriage, she seeks solace in chocolates. Both ladies soon became good friends.

Cast

References

External links 
Official profile in Filmpolski.pl database

2013 Polish television series debuts
Polish drama television series
Polsat original programming